The 1999 NCAA Division II men's basketball tournament was the 43rd annual single-elimination tournament to determine the national champion of men's NCAA Division II college basketball in the United States.

Officially culminating the 1998–99 NCAA Division II men's basketball season, the tournament featured forty-eight teams from around the country.

The Elite Eight, national semifinals, and championship were again played at the Commonwealth Convention Center in Louisville, Kentucky.

Kentucky Wesleyan (35–2) defeated Metro State in the final, 75–60, to win their record seventh Division II national championship. This title came one year after the Panthers' loss to UC Davis in the 1998 championship.

Kentucky Wesleyan was coached by Ray Harper. For the second consecutive year, KWC's Antonio Garcia was the Most Outstanding Player.

Regionals

Northeast - Albany, New York 
Location: Recreation and Convocation Center Host: College of Saint Rose

South Central - Wichita Falls, Texas 
Location: Gerald Stockton Court Host: Midwestern State University

East - Salem, West Virginia 
Location: T. Edward Davis Gymnasium Host: Salem-Teikyo University

North Central - Wayne, Nebraska 
Location: Rice Auditorium Host: Wayne State College

South Atlantic - Milledgeville, Georgia 
Location: Centennial Center Host: Georgia College & State University

Great Lakes - Owensboro, Kentucky 
Location: Sportscenter Host: Kentucky Wesleyan College

South - Memphis, Tennessee 
Location: Bruce Hall Host: LeMoyne-Owen College

West - Ellensburg, Washington 
Location: Nicholson Pavilion Host: Central Washington University

Elite Eight - Louisville, Kentucky
Location: Commonwealth Convention Center Host: Bellarmine College

All-tournament team
Antonio Garcia, Kentucky Wesleyan (MOP)
Dana Williams, Kentucky Wesleyan
Lee Barlow, Metro State
DeMarcos Anzures, Metro State
Innocent Kere, Florida Southern

See also
1999 NCAA Division II women's basketball tournament
1999 NCAA Division I men's basketball tournament
1999 NCAA Division III men's basketball tournament
1999 NAIA Division I men's basketball tournament
1999 NAIA Division II men's basketball tournament

References
 NCAA Division II men's basketball tournament Results
 1999 NCAA Division II men's basketball tournament jonfmorse.com

NCAA Division II men's basketball tournament
Tournament
NCAA Division II basketball tournament
NCAA Division II basketball tournament